Sandrine Domain (born 6 September 1971 at Strasbourg) is a former French athlete, who specialized in the triple jump.

Biography  
She won two  French National Championship titles in the  triple jump in 1991 and 2000.

She twice improved the French triple jump record, jumping 13.42 m on 26 July 1991 at Dijon during the French Athletic Championships, and  also jumping 14.15 m on 14 July  1996 at La Roche-sur-Yon.

Prize list  
 French Championships in Athletics   :  
 winner of the triple jump 1991 and 2000

Records

Notes and references  
 Docathlé2003, Fédération française d'athlétisme, 2003, p. 400

1971 births
Living people
French female triple jumpers